Rebecca Ferratti (née Underwood, born November 27, 1961) is an American model.

She has worked in over 25 films. She has been a dancer in many music videos and has posed in many magazines, including Playboy. She was Playmate of the Month in the June 1986 issue.

Early life 
Ferratti was born on November 27, 1961.

Career 
After her pictorial in Playboy, she had roles in several B movies. She was the señorita who kissed Martin Short's character at the end of Three Amigos.  She appeared in Ace Ventura Pet Detective as the former wife of Randall "Tex" Cobb's character, who hires Ace Ventura to retrieve her Shih Tzu the film's first scene. In Gor, and Outlaw of Gor she played a lead role. She was an original American Gladiator on TV for Metro-Goldwyn-Mayer Studio, 1st and 10  TV series with  OJ Simmons  and  NBC  Sweating Bullets.  Her last films were Wild CAT, Power Elite, and Swat with French American  Action Star Olivier  Gruner. Ferratti has appeared in over 33 music videos.

Filmography

Film

Music video
Ferratti worked as a dancer in music videos by the following artists:
Cheap Trick
Aerosmith
Mötley Crüe
David Lee Roth - "A Little Ain't Enough"
The Beach Boys
Winger - "Seventeen"
Donny Osmond
DIO
Huey Lewis and the News
Marc Anthony

See also
 List of people in Playboy 1980–1989

References

External links
 
 

1961 births
Living people
1980s Playboy Playmates
Actresses from Montana
American female dancers
American dancers
American film actresses
People from Helena, Montana
21st-century American women